Geoff Heise (sometimes credited as Geoffrey Heise) is a Hawaiian actor who has guest-starred in several television programmes.  He has appeared three episodes of Hawaii Five-O, an episode of Murder, She Wrote, three episodes of Magnum, P.I., two episodes of Step by Step, One West Waikiki, Baywatch and two episodes of Lost.

References

External links

Year of birth missing (living people)
Living people
Male actors from Hawaii
American male television actors